Leopoldo Verona (24 September 1931 – 14 July 2014) was an Argentine actor. His best known film roles were in I Need a Mother (1966), On the Beach by the Sea (1971) and La flor de la mafia (1974). He was born in Buenos Aires.

Verona died on 14 July 2014 in Buenos Aires, aged 82.

References

Other websites
 

1931 births
2014 deaths
Argentine male film actors
Argentine male stage actors
Argentine male television actors
Male actors from Buenos Aires